Anna Holmes "Nancy" Northcroft  (23 March 1913 – 31 July 1980) was a New Zealand town planner. She was born in Hamilton, New Zealand, on 23 March 1913. Her father was lawyer and later Supreme Court judge Erima Northcroft.

In the 1978 New Year Honours, Northcroft was appointed an Officer of the Order of the British Empire, for services to town planning.

References

1913 births
1980 deaths
People from Hamilton, New Zealand
New Zealand urban planners
New Zealand Officers of the Order of the British Empire